Tracks in the Snow (German: Spuren im Schnee) is a 1929 German silent film directed by Willy Reiber and starring Peter Voß, Ilse Stobrawa and Will Dohm.

The film's art direction was by Ludwig Reiber. It was made at the Emelka Studios in Munich.

Cast
 Peter Voß as Klaus Meill 
 Ilse Stobrawa as Herta Frank  
 Will Dohm as Victor Horn  
 Franz Loskarn as Der Obergrenzer 
 Hanns Beck-Gaden as Der Freund 
 Walter Grüters

References

External links

1929 films
Films of the Weimar Republic
Films directed by Willy Reiber
German silent feature films
Bavaria Film films
German black-and-white films